Grégory Tadé (born 2 September 1986) is a French professional footballer who plays as a forward for Lowland League club Cumbernauld Colts.

Tadé started his senior career by featuring for various teams in Scotland, of which Inverness Caledonian Thistle and St Johnstone in the Scottish Premier League, where he amassed over 70 appearances combined.

After seven years in the latter country, Tadé moved to Romanian side CFR Cluj in 2013. He finished his second season at the team as the Liga I top goalscorer, which prompted a transfer to FC Steaua București. He failed to make an impact in the capital, and then spent his late years in Qatar, Israel and back in Scotland.

Career

Scotland
Tadé began his career with Orvault Sports Football in his native France, but moved to Scotland in 2006 to join Forfar Athletic. He was not given a new contract at Forfar, and joined Stranraer in July 2007. In a match with East Fife in January 2008, Tadé was the victim of racial abuse, with opposing player Kevin Fotheringham alleged to have made racist remarks in his direction.

Tadé made the step up to the Scottish Football League First Division on 24 January 2009, signing for Clyde, after making 61 appearances in total for Stranraer, scoring 23 goals. He made his debut on the same day, playing 75 minutes in Clyde's 2–0 victory over Ross County. Tadé was released by Clyde in June 2009 along with the rest of the out of contract players, due to the club's financial position. He went on to sign for newly promoted Raith Rovers. He became a fan favourite and helped the club to the Scottish Cup semi-final and the next season to second place in the Scottish First Division.

Tadé refused contract offers by Raith Rovers at the end of the 2010–11 season and signed for Inverness Caledonian Thistle. He made his Inverness debut against Motherwell at Fir Park on 23 July.

Tadé signed for St Johnstone under freedom of contract in June 2012. He scored his first goal for St Johnstone in their Europa League qualifier against Eskişehirspor on 26 July 2012.

Romania
In June 2013, Tadé penned down a three-year deal with Romanian team CFR Cluj. Two years later, he moved to reigning Liga I champions FC Steaua București, but was unable to bring his form to the capital and only scored four times in the league during his only season at the club. On 19 July 2016, his contract was terminated and he became a free agent.

Qatar SC / Maccabi Petah Tikva
On 20 July 2016, Tadé signed for Qatar Stars League side Qatar Sports Club.

In November 2018, Tadé returned to Romania to join former rivals from Dinamo București. He only appeared in a exhibition loss to Concordia Chiajna, after which the club announced that he would undergo a medical intervention in Turkey. His contract was cancelled the following month, thus never featuring for Dinamo in an official match.

Return to Scotland
Tadé returned to Scottish football to sign on amateur terms with former club Clyde in July 2021. On 3 May 2022, Tadé was one of ten players released by Clyde at the end of the 2021–22 season. Tadé joined Lowland League club Cumbernauld Colts in the summer of 2022.

Personal life
Tadé is of Ivorian descent, and his cousin Armand Oné was also a professional footballer.

Career statistics

Club

Honours
Steaua București
Cupa Ligii: 2015–16

Individual
Liga I top scorer: 2014–15

References

External links

1986 births
Living people
French sportspeople of Ivorian descent
Black French sportspeople
French footballers
Footballers from Nantes
Association football forwards
Scottish Football League players
Scottish Professional Football League players
Scottish Premier League players
Forfar Athletic F.C. players
Stranraer F.C. players
Clyde F.C. players
Inverness Caledonian Thistle F.C. players
Raith Rovers F.C. players
St Johnstone F.C. players
Liga I players
CFR Cluj players
FC Steaua București players
FC Dinamo București players
Qatari Second Division players
Qatar SC players
Israeli Premier League players
Maccabi Petah Tikva F.C. players
French expatriate footballers
Expatriate footballers in Scotland
Expatriate footballers in Romania
Expatriate footballers in Israel
French expatriate sportspeople in Scotland
French expatriate sportspeople in Romania
French expatriate sportspeople in Israel
Lowland Football League players
Cumbernauld Colts F.C. players